Henry C. Myers (May, 1858April 18, 1895) was an American Major League Baseball player from Philadelphia, Pennsylvania, who played mainly at shortstop for three seasons from  to .

The team had many players with little or no Major League experience, and like Myers, many were from the Philadelphia area. Besides playing shortstop for the Orioles, he was also the manager. They finished last,  games behind the 5th place team, with a 19–54 win–loss record. He would never manage again, and made a short playing appearance in 1884 for the Wilmington Quicksteps of the Union Association.

Henry died in Philadelphia at the age of 36, and was buried at Mount Vernon Cemetery.

See also
List of Major League Baseball player-managers

References

External links

1858 births
1895 deaths
19th-century baseball players
Baseball players from Philadelphia
Major League Baseball shortstops
Providence Grays players
Baltimore Orioles (AA) players
Baltimore Orioles (1882–1899) managers
Burials at Mount Vernon Cemetery (Philadelphia)
Wilmington Quicksteps players
Philadelphia (minor league baseball) players
Philadelphia Athletic players
Hornellsville Hornells players
Worcester Grays players
Baltimore (minor league baseball) players
Philadelphia Athletics (minor league) players
Harrisburg (minor league baseball) players
Trenton Trentonians players
Albany Senators players
Reading (minor league baseball) players
Wheeling (minor league baseball) players
Portland (minor league baseball) players
Easton (minor league baseball) players
Minor league baseball managers
Major League Baseball player-managers